New Ross (formerly ) is a town in southwest County Wexford, Ireland. In 2016 it had a population of 8,040 people, making it the fourth-largest town in the county.

History

The port town of New Ross dates from the pre-Middle Ages. The earliest settlement in this area dates to the 6th century when St. Abban of Magheranoidhe founded a monastery in what is now Irishtown. The original earthen-banked circular enclosure of his monastery was visible around the graveyard until it was removed by the council. It was replaced by a concrete wall and steel fence. Its name, Ros, was shortened from Ros Mhic Treoin, or the Wood of the Son of Treoin.

New Ross was in the territory of Dermot McMurrough and came to prominence when the Anglo-Normans conquered the region. The Norman knight William Marshall and his bride Isabella de Clare arrived during the early part of the 13th century. An earthen defensive structure called a motte was built at Old Ross in order to hold the newly conquered territory. A medieval borough sprung up around it - peopled by English and Welsh settlers. The arrival of Isabella and William is described in the Chronicles of Ross, which are in the British Museum. It records that in 1189, Isabella set about "building a lovely city on the banks of the Barrow". The town's fortunes further increased when King John made William the Earl of Pembroke at his coronation in 1199. A year later, the Earl Marshal transferred the Norman capital of Leinster to Kilkenny and New Ross became the main port.

The town grew around the bridge built by William Marshal, son-in-law of Richard de Clare, 2nd Earl of Pembroke (Strongbow), and a leader of the Norman invasion of Ireland. The town of New Ross (the town of the new bridge) was granted a Royal Charter in 1207. The port gained concessions from King John in 1215 and again in 1227 but these were later revoked by Henry III and Edward I to protect the port of Waterford. New Ross was still Ireland's busiest port in the 13th century. These restrictions were lifted in the 14th century by Edward II and Edward III. In the late 13th century the town was placed for a time under a papal interdict, following a riot in which several monks of the Order of Crutched Friars were killed.

St Mary's Abbey (Church of Ireland) was built in 1811. There are two Roman Catholic churches, the parish church of SS. Michael and Mary completed in 1902, and the Augustinian church opened in 1835.

The town was fought over in the Irish Confederate Wars of the 1640s.  In 1643, the town resisted the siege by James Butler, 1st Duke of Ormonde, who fought a battle near the town with an Irish army under Thomas Preston, 1st Viscount Tara but later re-conquered by Oliver Cromwell in 1649 who discharged three cannon shots at the Aldgate. The town is at an important crossing point, sited on the River Barrow between the river estuary to the south and the point where the River Nore joins the Barrow to the north. It was the location of one of the bloodiest battles of the 1798 rebellion.

Education
There are four primary schools in New Ross, two for boys, one for girls and one co-education school. The two boys' schools are Michael Street National School which caters for children from Junior Infants up until 1st Class. They then move up to the Senior school, New Ross CBS, which children attend from 2nd class onwards. The girls' primary school, St Joseph's, caters for students from Junior Infants to 6th Class. There is a mixed school in New Ross, St Canice's, which is situated across the bridge in Rosbercon. There are five secondary schools in New Ross, one is all-boys, two are all-girls, and two are mixed.

St Augustine's and Good Counsel College, New Ross, is an all-boys school that caters for over 750 students making it by far the largest school in New Ross. St Mary's and Our Lady of Lourdes are the two all-girl secondary schools. The two mixed schools are Kennedy College and CBS Secondary.

Sport
Sporting organisations in the town of New Ross include New Ross Triathlon Club, Geraldine O'Hanrahans GAA Club, St Michaels Boxing Club, New Ross RFC, New Ross Celtic Soccer Club, New Ross Town Soccer Club, New Ross Boat Club, New Ross Badminton Club, New Ross Swimming Club, Dunbrody Archers, United Striders AC and New Ross Golf Club.

Arts and culture
The town's arts centre is St Michael's Theatre. The present building was built in 1806, eight years after the insurrection of 1798 and served as the parish church until 1902 when the new parish church, St Mary's & Michael's, was opened. St Michael's has a staff of 12, a 300-seat theatre, a 50-seat studio venue, an art gallery, a cinema, a coffee shop and a bar.

New Ross is home to the Ros Tapestry Project, a community initiative undertaken throughout County Wexford by a team of 150 voluntary embroiderers. The Ros Tapestries depict events including the founding of New Ross by William Marshall. The first tapestry was completed in 2002 and to date all but one of the 15 tapestries are complete. In 2009 the Ros Tapestry Exhibition was opened at The Quay, New Ross.

Transport

Road
The N30 links Enniscorthy and New Ross.

Bus links
The town is served by several bus routes and its main stop is on the town's quay. There are services to and from Waterford each day. Bus Éireann is the principal operator providing Expressway services to Dublin and Dublin Airport and to Rosslare Europort and Cork as well as local services. Wexford Bus operate a service between Wexford and Waterford while Kilbride Coaches operate a route linking the town to Kilkenny. Wexford Local Link operates services to Enniscorthy.

Rail
New Ross (Rosbercon) railway station opened on 19 September 1887, closed for passenger traffic on 30 March 1964 and closed for goods traffic by 1995. It was an important link between the lines serving Dublin to Rosslare, Bagenalstown via Palace East and on to Waterford. In 2020 the last tracks were lifted in preparation for a new greenway. Some of the track was salvaged by the Waterford and Suir Valley Railway for preservation and reuse.

Sea
A small marina is located downstream of the town. The tall ship Asgard II which provided sail-training, sometimes docked in New Ross on its travels.

Economy
Until the creation of ships too large to reach the port, in the 19th century, New Ross was a port town. However, the river is too shallow to allow passage of large ships and the port gradually went into decline. The town continued to be a market town for the rich agricultural hinterland but suffered from recession throughout the 1970s, 1980s, and early part of the 1990s. As of the 21st century, there is some industry in the area, with businesses centring on services and retail. Retail outlets including Tesco, Lidl and Aldi are located away from the centre of town.

Tourism
The Ros Tapestry Exhibition Centre located on the Quay in New Ross is a series of 15 embroidered Tapestry panels. Depicting Celtic Ireland looking at Celtic rituals, woman warriors and Brehon Law, to early Christian Ireland, the Vikings of Wexford and the ousting of Diarmait MacMurchada from his Kingdom of Leinster and sailing to France in search of King Henry II. Also depicted is William Marshal who married Isabel de Clare heiress of Strongbow, Earl of Pembroke and granddaughter of Diarmait MacMurchada. 

New Ross is home to the Dunbrody replica famine ship which is moored on the Quay. The town also houses the Emigrant Flame; a constantly burning flame in a memorandum of the emigrants of the famine.

A statue of John F. Kennedy is located on the quayside. The statue was unveiled in July 2008 by his sister Jean Kennedy Smith. The JFK Dunbrody Festival is held each year in July in the town and centres primarily on live music on the festival stage.

In the village of Duncannon,  to the south of New Ross, Duncannon Fort is located alongside a Blue Flag beach.

The name of Liverpool F.C.'s stadium at Anfield road came from the old townland of Annefield in New Ross.

It is not related to the O'Kennedy Park Wexford GAA stadium.

People
 Sean Connick, Fianna Fáil TD from 2007-2011.
 James Cullen, priest and founder of the Pioneer Total Abstinence Association, was born in New Ross
 Kevin Doyle, Irish international soccer player
 Martin Doyle, Victoria Cross recipient
 Patrick Kennedy, great-grandfather of U.S. President John F. Kennedy
 Seán O'Kennedy, captain of the record breaking Wexford Gaelic Football All-Ireland champions 1915-1918
 Gráinne Murphy, swimmer who won silver at the 2010 European Long Course Championships and bronze at the 2010 European Short Course Championships
 Thomas Joseph Power, Bishop of St. John’s, Newfoundland
 John Redmond, MP for New Ross
 Maverick Sabre, Singer

Twinnings
New Ross has town twinning agreements with the communities of:
 Hartford, Connecticut, US
 Moncoutant, Poitou-Charentes, France
 Newcastle, County Down

See also

List of towns and villages in Ireland
 Market Houses in Ireland

References

 
Port cities and towns in the Republic of Ireland
Towns and villages in County Wexford
Articles on towns and villages in Ireland possibly missing Irish place names
Populated places established in the 12th century